The 1943–44 Chicago Black Hawks season was the team's 18th season in the NHL, and they were coming off a 5th-place finish in 1942–43, failing to qualify for the playoffs.

The Black Hawks would once again finish just under .500, with a 22–23–5 record, good for 49 points, and 4th place in the NHL.  The Hawks 178 goals would rank them just ahead of the New York Rangers for 5th in the league, while the 187 goals they let in ranked 4th.  The team would qualify for the playoffs, as they would have 6 more points than the 5th place Boston Bruins.

Doug Bentley would have another huge season, breaking the Black Hawks record for points in a season, which he set in the 1942–43 season, by earning 77 points, along with a club record 38 goals, which led the NHL.  Clint Smith, who the Black Hawks acquired from the Rangers in the off-season, would set a club record with 49 assists, and win the Lady Byng Trophy.  Bill Mosienko would have a break out season with 32 goals and 70 points.  Earl Seibert would anchor the defense, leading all defensemen with 33 points and had a team high 40 penalty minutes.

In goal, the Hawks would begin the season with Hec Highton in goal, however, after a 10–14–0 start, and a GAA of 4.50, the Hawks would trade him to the Providence Reds of the American Hockey League for former Hawks goaltender Mike Karakas.  Karakas would put together a 12–9–5 record with a 3.04 GAA, helping Chicago clinch the final playoff spot.

The Black Hawks would have a first-round playoff date with the second place Detroit Red Wings, who finished 9 points better than Chicago in the regular season, in a best-of-seven series.  The Hawks and Wings would split the opening two games in Detroit, and Chicago would take a 2–1 series lead by shutting out the Red Wings in game three.  The Black Hawks would dominate game four, winning 7–1 and take a commanding 3–1 series lead.  Chicago would then complete the upset in game five, defeating the Wings 5–2 in Detroit, and earn a spot in the Stanley Cup finals for the first time since 1941.  Their opponent would be the Montreal Canadiens, who dominated the NHL with 83 points, 34 points better than the Hawks in the regular season.  Chicago would prove to be no match for the powerful Canadiens, as they would sweep the Black Hawks, including a Stanley Cup clinching win in overtime in the 4th game, to win the 1944 Stanley Cup.

Season standings

Record vs. opponents

Game log

Regular season

Playoffs

Chicago Black Hawks 4, Detroit Red Wings 1

Montreal Canadiens 4, Chicago Black Hawks 0

Season stats

Scoring leaders

Goaltending

Playoff stats

Scoring leaders

Goaltending

References
SHRP Sports
The Internet Hockey Database
National Hockey League Guide & Record Book 2007

Notes

Chicago Blackhawks seasons
Chicago
Chicago